LandesEcho is a German-language magazine in the Czech Republic issued every 14 days by the Landesversammlung der deutschen Vereine in der Tschechischen Republik in Prague.

External links
  (German)

 German diaspora in the Czech Republic
 Publications established in 1994
 1994 establishments in the Czech Republic